The George W. Woodruff School of Mechanical Engineering is the oldest and second largest department in the College of Engineering at the Georgia Institute of Technology. The school offers degree programs in mechanical engineering and nuclear and radiological engineering that are accredited by ABET. In its 2019 ranking list, U.S. News & World Report placed the school ranks 2nd in undergraduate mechanical engineering, 5th in graduate mechanical engineering, and 9th in graduate nuclear and radiological engineering.

The school took its present name in 1985, honoring George W. Woodruff (class of 1917), a major benefactor.

The school is the only academic institution to be recognized as a Mechanical Engineering Heritage Site by the American Society of Mechanical Engineers.

Degrees offered 

The G. W. Woodruff School offers two undergraduate degrees, five graduate degrees, and four post-graduate degrees.
 BS: Mechanical Engineering
 BS: Nuclear and Radiological Engineering
 MS: Mechanical Engineering
 MS: Nuclear Engineering
 MS: Medical Physics
 MS: Paper Science & Engineering
 MS: Bioengineering
 PhD: with a Major in Mechanical Engineering
 PhD: with a Major in Nuclear and Radiological Engineering
 PhD: with a Major in Bioengineering
 PhD: with a Major in Paper Science & Engineering

Facilities 

The G.W. Woodruff School occupies eight buildings, most of which are located in west campus.
Fuller E. Callaway Jr. Manufacturing Research Center (MARC)
Integrated Acoustics Laboratory (anechoic-chamber)
Manufacturing, CAE/Design, and Automation/ Mechatronics research groups
Manufacturing Related Disciplines Complex (MRDC)
Tribology and Mechanics of Materials research groups
Student machine shops including "Invention Studio"
J. Erskine Love Jr. Manufacturing Building (MRDC II)
Underwater acoustics tank, wind tunnel, and MEMS clean room
Acoustics, Fluid Mechanics, Heat Transfer, and MEMS research groups
Frank H. Neely Research Center
Nuclear and Radiological Engineering/Medical Physics program
Fission, Fusion, and Medical Physics research groups
Parker H. Petit Biotechnology Building
Bioengineering research group
Institute of Paper Science and Technology
Heat Transfer research group
Robert C. Williams Paper Museum
IPST Centennial Engineering Building
Student Competition Center (Tin Building)
Houses various student competition groups, including GT motorsports, GT Off-Road (the SAE-baja team), Robojackets and Wreck Racing

See also 
 John Saylor Coon
 J. Brandon Dixon
 Julie Linsey

References 

Georgia Tech colleges and schools
Engineering schools and colleges in the United States
Engineering universities and colleges in Georgia (U.S. state)
Educational institutions established in 1885
1885 establishments in Georgia (U.S. state)